Hossein Pirnia, also known as Mo'tamen al Molk (1875–1948) was an Iranian politician. His father, Mirza Nasrullah Khan, and his elder brother, Hassan Pirnia, both served as Prime Minister of Iran.

Career
He served as speaker of the Parliament of Iran from 1914 to 1925, and again from 1928 to 1929.

Pirnia played a significant role in the drafting of the Persian Constitution of 1906 and served as Minister of Education in 1918 and Minister without portfolio in 1920. He was elected to every session of the Parliament (Majlis) from 1906, serving as speaker for more than eleven years in total. In 1943 he was elected from Tehran to the 14th session of Parliament but declined to serve.

Sources
 Ghani, Cyrus. Iran and the Rise of Reza Shah: From Qajar Collapse to Pahlavi Power. I.B. Tauris: London, 2000. 
 Azimi, Fakhreddin. The Quest for Democracy in Iran. Harvard University Press: 2010. 

1875 births
1948 deaths
Moderate Socialists Party politicians
Speakers of the National Consultative Assembly
Members of the 1st Iranian Majlis
Members of the 2nd Iranian Majlis
Members of the 3rd Iranian Majlis
Deputies of Hamadan for National Consultative Assembly
Deputies of Tehran for National Consultative Assembly
Members of the 6th Iranian Majlis
20th-century Iranian politicians
People of Qajar Iran